Orange jelly candy are finger-sized sticks of soft jelly candy generally sold in food specialty stores in Hong Kong. A great deal of candy available in Hong Kong is imported from Europe, mainland China, United States and other regions around the world. Orange jelly candy is one of the few that have historically been manufactured locally in Hong Kong.

History
The 1980s version of the candy came with a thin transparent layer that is basically an edible wrapper. The candy is made at Smith's confectionery factory (史蜜夫糖果廠) at Kwun Tong.  The jelly sticks are very soft and sweet. It does not have much of an orange taste despite the name.

Related products
In the early 1990s, the company produced a hard candy named Orange Arm-Cicle (a play on the words icicle and arm because of its pointed shape and use of locomotion, much like a spinning or rotating lollipop). The actual candy, like the jelly candy, does not taste like orange; it does, however, come in a variety of flavors, often changing color during certain Public holidays in Hong Kong.

See also
 Jelly bean
 List of candies
 White Rabbit Creamy Candy

References

Chinese confectionery
Gummi candies